is the sixth single released by the Japanese boyband Kanjani8. This single marked the change of labels from Teichiku Records to Imperial Records because the group's sound hand changed from Enka to Pop. "Zukkoke Otoko Michi" sound was of the disco/pop variety and unsuited for the label.

Track listing

Regular Edition
 " Zukkoke Otoko Michi "
 " Ai ni Mukatte "
 " Explosion "
 " Zukkoke Otoko Michi <Original Karaoke> "

Limited Edition
 " Zukkoke Otoko Michi "
 " Ai ni Mukatte "
 " Zukkoke Otoko Michi <Original Karaoke> "

Charts

References

2007 singles
Kanjani Eight songs
Oricon Weekly number-one singles
2007 songs